Perittia serica is a moth of the family Elachistidae. It is found in Colorado.

The length of the forewings is about 6 mm. The ground color of the forewings is silky white, with scattered yellowish scales especially near the apex. The hindwings are slightly translucent gray.

References

Elachistidae
Moths described in 1995
Moths of North America